Bou Craa (also transliterated as Bo Craa, Bu Craa or Boukra) (Berber: ⴱⵓⴽⵔⴰⵄ) is a town in Western Sahara, south-east of the main city of El Aaiún. It is inhabited almost exclusively by employees of phosphate company Phosboucraa, a subsidiary of Morocco's OCP Group. 

Historically located in the Saguia el-Hamra region, Bou Craa is the site of a phosphate deposit of over 1.7 billion tons. Mining operations by Phosboucraa started in 1972. During the Spanish colonization of the area (see Spanish Sahara), many early recruits of Sahrawi nationalist movements such as the Movement for the Liberation of Saguia el Hamra and Wadi el Dhahab and Polisario Front were workers in the phosphate mines.

The town became part of the Moroccan-controlled zone in the April 1976 partition resulting from the Madrid Accords. It has remained in Moroccan hands, though mining was paused in 1976 as a result of Polisario guerilla attacks. During the Western Sahara War the Polisario sabotaged and disabled this transportation system several times. These attacks gradually ceased in the early 1980s when the town become enclosed by the Moroccan Wall, which consolidated Moroccan control over the north-western part of Western Sahara (the so-called "Useful Triangle"). Mining resumed on a reduced scale in July 1982.

Today, the mine produces around 3 million tonnes annually, which represents 10% of Morocco's total production. The phosphates are transported to the coast by an automated conveyor belt, which is the longest conveyor belt in the world, the belt is also visible from space.

Twin towns
 Castro Urdiales, Spain
 Llodio, Spain

References

External links
World’s Longest Conveyor Belt System, from the Bou Craa mine to the port at El Marsa, Western Sahara. Article at NASA Earth Observatory,  January 21, 2023

Populated places in Western Sahara
Mines in Western Sahara
Company towns
Phosphate mines
Rural communes of Morocco
Populated places in Laâyoune Province